The "Draft Condi"  movement (or "Draft Rice" movement) was a grassroots effort to draft United States Secretary of State Condoleezza Rice to run for President of the United States in the 2008 U.S. election.

At that time, Rice had become one of the most powerful female and African American political figures in U.S. history. In August 2004 and again in August 2005 Forbes magazine named Rice the world's most powerful woman. And in August 2006, Forbes named Rice the second most powerful woman in the world, behind Angela Merkel, the German chancellor.

Rice was fourth in line to succeed George W. Bush as president.  That is higher in the U.S. presidential line of succession than any woman before Nancy Pelosi became the Speaker of the House. (Former Secretary of State Madeleine Albright was not a natural-born U.S. citizen and was therefore ineligible to become president.)

On April 8, 2008, Rice denied any interest in serving as running mate for John McCain, stating that she intended instead to return to Stanford University. Her supporters have touted a future vice presidential or presidential candidacy, and formerly as a candidate for the 2018 California Gubernatorial election.

Statements by Rice and others about her candidacy
Rice repeatedly said that she had no desire or interest in becoming president. Interviewed by Tim Russert on March 14, 2005, Rice declared, "I will not run for president of the United States. How is that? I don't know how many ways to say 'no' in this town."

During an interview with Russian Echo Moscow Radio, Rice was asked about her intentions concerning running for president. When asked by a schoolgirl, "One day you will run for president?" she replied, "President, да, да [yes, yes]," before she quickly answered with "нет, нет, нет [no, no, no]."

However, in May 2005, several of Rice's associates claimed that she would be willing to run for the presidency if she were drafted into the race. On October 16, 2005, on NBC's Meet the Press, Rice again denied she would run for president in 2008. While she said she was flattered that many people wanted her to run, she said it was not what she wanted to do with her life. Rice told Fox News Sunday host, Chris Wallace: "I'm quite certain that there are going to be really fine candidates for president from our party, and I'm looking forward to seeing them and perhaps supporting them." Interviewed on BBC television's The Politics Show on October 23, she again stated her decision not to run.

Certain high-profile political figures, including Laura Bush, former White House Spokesman Scott McClellan, and world leaders such as Russian President Vladimir Putin and former Australian Prime Minister John Howard have also voiced encouragement.  Laura Bush has perhaps been the strongest proponent of Rice's candidacy.  On CNN's The Situation Room on January 17, 2006, Mrs. Bush implicated Rice when asked if she thought the United States would soon have a female president, stating: "I'd love to see her run.  She's terrific."  Mrs. Bush then turned to advocacy during an interview on CNN's Larry King Live on March 24, 2006, in which she stated that Rice would make an "excellent president," and that she wished Americans could "talk her into running." However, Mrs. Bush has also stated that Rice will not run for president "[p]robably because she is single, her parents are no longer living, she's an only child. You need a very supportive family and supportive friends to have this job."

Rice was frequently mentioned as a possible opponent of Hillary Clinton in the 2008 election, a scenario that was the subject of the book Condi vs. Hillary: The Next Great Presidential Race, by political strategist Dick Morris and his wife, Eileen McGann-Morris, published in October 2005.

Rice had publicly expressed aspirations to become the next commissioner of the National Football League and following the announcement of Paul Tagliabue's retirement, she was widely believed to be a serious contender for the post.  If appointed to the office, she would have been both the first African American and the first female commissioner of any North American major sports league. However, Rice, a Cleveland Browns fan, said she was not interested in replacing Tagliabue, saying that she preferred to remain as Secretary of State.

Poll results

In May 2007, the Des Moines Register found that among Republicans "one-half of likely participants in the party’s caucuses would like to see Rice, the U.S. secretary of state, campaign for president", a greater portion than for Fred Thompson or Newt Gingrich.

References

Condoleezza Rice
2008 in women's history
Republican Party (United States)
2008 United States presidential campaigns